{{DISPLAYTITLE:C25H32O4}}
The molecular formula C25H32O4 (molar mass: 396.52 g/mol, exact mass: 396.2301 u) may refer to:

 Anthracimycin
 Melengestrol acetate (MLGA)
 Nandrolone furylpropionate (NFP)